Cartoon Network is a Latin American pay television channel distributed by Warner Bros. Discovery for the Latin American audience and the Caribbean. It is the Latin American version of the original Cartoon Network television channel in the United States. It is divided into five feeds, all originating from its central headquarters in Atlanta, Georgia, United States; four are in Spanish (Mexico, Argentina/Uruguay, Chile/Peru, Colombia/Venezuela/Central America) and the other is in Portuguese for Brazil. The feeds have different schedules.

It primarily airs cartoons and animated programming, marketed towards children and teens. Operated in Argentina by Turner Broadcasting System Latin America, it began broadcasting on April 30, 1993, as the first children-oriented cable channel available in the region. Argentina and Mexico had previously launched children's cable channels (The Big Channel and Cablín in Argentina and ZAZ in Mexico, all of which are now defunct), but they were only available in their respective countries.

History
Cartoon Network began broadcasting in Latin America on April 30, 1993, becoming the first 24-hour children's animation channel in the region. Although much is not known about its first broadcast in the region, its beginnings were similar to its U.S. counterpart, whose programming focused solely on the classic cartoons of the Turner Entertainment film library, made up of studios Hanna-Barbera, MGM, Warner Bros. and Fleischer Studios. Its programming and graphics used at that time were the same as the U.S. feed, with the difference that between 1993 and 1995, the Latin American feed was just a Spanish-language feed from the United States, which was broadcast exclusively to the region. It was not until 1996 that this feed became completely independent of the US feed, and this began to have its own programming with its own schedules, as well as new worldwide acquisitions for the channel.

In 1996, it began broadcasting its first original series, beginning with Space Ghost Coast to Coast, an original reinvention of Hanna-Barbera's superhero, which even gained the popularity of adult audiences. In addition, new original channel series were incorporated at that time, known as Cartoon Cartoons: Dexter's Laboratory, Johnny Bravo, Cow and Chicken, I Am Weasel, The Powerpuff Girls and Ed, Edd and Eddy, which became the channel's flagship series.

In 2001, Cartoon Network made the first edition of Copa Toon, a soccer special featuring the cast of Space Ghost, whose theme was to interview several personalities from the world of sports and soccer, in addition to presenting a fictional tournament between the teams of the channel series. In that same year, it launched its new sister channel Boomerang, at that time, a new channel that would be dedicated solely to broadcast of classic Hanna-Barbera cartoons that no longer aired in the programming of the main channel due to the arrival of new series. This channel had already been launched in 2000 in the United States, and until then, it was also a block broadcast in the main channel.

In January 2005, Cartoon Network introduced a new logo along with a new visual branding known as the "CN City", with a new slogan We know what you really like (Spanish: Sabemos lo que realmente te gusta; Portuguese: Nós sabemos do que você realmente gosta). This change of image had already been applied first to the American feed in June 2004, and with this change of image, Cartoon Network introduced new programming confirmed by new original series such as Foster's Home for Imaginary Friends, besides new acquisitions and thematic blocks. In October of the same year, the Adult Swim block was released in Latin America after 4 years of being released in the United States, focused on the adult audience of the channel with adult animations for over 18 years. The block debuted due to the popularity of the program ''Space Ghost Coast to Coast'', one of the first programs of the channel aimed exclusively at this audience.

In March 2008, Cartoon Network presented its new locally produced content, a new campaign with a new image and a complete redesign of its websites. After these changes, the Adult Swim block was removed from the channel supposedly because of Consumer Protection Committee, considering that this segment with adult content should not be broadcast on a children's channel. However, the block continued to be broadcast by I.Sat until December 2010; years later, the block returned to the same channel in April 2015 until April 2020, when this block was moved to Warner Channel.

In June and July 2010, the channel began to use small idents with the logo in white, in which Toonix (similar to the Noods of the United States) appeared, originally promoting the 2010 Soccer World Cup. In August 2010, the Toonix era became official, using small ads and promotional campaigns similar to those used by the Noods era of Cartoon Network, from August 2008 to June 2010. On July 6, 2011, the Toonix era began transmissions in the 16:9 aspect ratio (panoramic) with the series Total Drama although it was only experimental.

On January 8, 2012, the channel launched a new logo and visual identity. In March 2012, its high-definition simulcast was launched. However, the launch of the new feed could not take place, as its distribution was still under negotiation with other cable operators in the region.

The network incorporated new age rating system notices, identifying the type of content and what type of viewers could watch. In April 2013, the channel began its 20th-anniversary celebrations. Several Turner channels joined in the celebration, including Warner, TruTV, I-Sat, Boomerang, TNT, TCM and Tooncast. With this, the classic daytime programs were broadcast for that month. The celebration took place again in September, celebrating the 21st anniversary of the American signal, this time with the inclusion and the premiere of Teen Titans Go!.

On January 23, 2014, the Panregional and South Atlantic feeds merged, causing the establishment of the Argentine schedule in the same feed being one of the two official times of the feed, along with the Colombian.

On August 11, 2014, the channel began the "Check It 3.0" era branding (known in Latin America as "Cartoon Network Renewed") and, also, it changed its aspect ratio from 4:3 to 16:9 in all its feeds. Cartoon Network's HD feed was launched in Mexico on December 5, 2014, being Axtel the first cable operator to acquire the signal. It was an HD simulcast of the channel's Mexico feed.

On June 1, 2015, the South Atlantic feed was separated from the Panregional feed, the latter being divided in two, leading to the creation of new independent feeds for the general public. These were the North Atlantic feed (available for Colombia, Venezuela, Central America and the Caribbean) and the Pacific feed (available for Chile, Peru, Ecuador and Bolivia); this was done for the purpose of launching new individual high-definition feeds throughout the region. On August 3, new bumpers were shown depicting children imitating their favourite characters; this event was named a sub-rebrand of the Check it 3.0 era listed as 3.5. For this purpose, the application CN blah! was launched.

On January 11, 2016, the brand was reinforced with a new graphic identity, the "Check it 4.0" era.

On January 9, 2017, Cartoon Network began using the "Dimensional" era with new graphics in the promos of the blocks Ja, Ja, Ja/Ha, Ha, Ha (Brazil), Heroes (Héroes/Heróis) and Cine Cartoon, with the premiere of new bumpers and the premiere of Mighty Magiswords and Justice League Action.

The channel celebrated its 25th anniversary on April 30, 2018, so a block was created to commemorate it. The block "Que No Pare la Fiesta"/"Que Não Pare a Festa" was broadcast in April and September to commemorate the channel's 25th anniversary.

On April 1, 2022, it introduced the "Redraw Your World" Era with new graphics and a new typeface.

Programming

The channel primarily airs shows and animated series, both original to Cartoon Network and others which have been acquired from outside networks.

10 of the 15 most popular shows among children aged 6-to-10 years old were broadcast by Cartoon Network Latin America, including The Powerpuff Girls, Dexter's Laboratory, Cow and Chicken, Johnny Bravo, and I Am Weasel. Older franchises like Scooby-Doo, Tom and Jerry, and Looney Tunes were also broadcast, as well as popular global anime franchises like Pokémon and newest original series such as the Ben 10 franchise, Adventure Time, Regular Show, The Amazing World of Gumball, Steven Universe and The Powerpuff Girls reboot. Cartoon Network Latin America has also aired original productions and live-action series such as La CQ, the channel's first original Mexican live-action series which premiered in 2012. In 2014, the channel acquired Digimon Fusion and Power Rangers Megaforce in a partnership with Saban Brands, and both series premiered on the channel in May 2014.

Services 
Since 2007, the channel has offered different services.

Cartoon Network Mobile 
Cartoon Network Mobile is a paid service for mobile phones, offering videos, wallpapers, games, screensavers, speech tones, ringtones, among other products.

Feed structure 
All feeds are generated by central headquarters in Atlanta, Georgia and also broadcast both programming and continuity in English through SAP.
Mexico. Aimed at Mexico. It uses the Mexico City timezone as its main timezone. It is available to Central American countries on satellite TV provider Sky 
Feed 2: Colombia, Venezuela, Central America and the Caribbean.
Feed 3: Chile, Peru, Ecuador and Bolivia.
Feed 4: Argentina, Paraguay and Uruguay.
Brazil.

Programming blocks
JA JA JA/HA HA HA: A block that airs several comedy shows, including The Amazing World of Gumball, Apple & Onion, Craig of the Creek, Teen Titans Go! and We Bare Bears.
Cine Cartoon: A block that airs full-length movies, both animated and live-action. Airs weekends, with new movies premiering every Friday. 
Hora Cartoonito/Cartoonito Hour: A one-hour block that airs preschool shows from its newly launched sister channel Cartoonito like Masha and the Bear, Little Ellen, Lucas the Spider and Thomas & Friends: All Engines Go.

Toonami
On December 2, 2002, Cartoon Network premiered Toonami block, replacing a similarly themed block, Talisman. Toonami aired shows that were already on the lineup, these being Gundam Wing, Pokémon and Dragon Ball Z, and served as the home of Inuyasha.  Over the years, Toonami added shows such as Saint Seiya and Yu Yu Hakusho, as well as the revamped version of Cyborg 009 and Astro Boy.  However, the block had to move to the late-night slots on CN Latin America, due to protests of violent scenes on the block. CN moved the block in November 2004.

In 2005, Toonami had short-lived weekend schedules, which were later replaced by the premiere of Adult Swim in Latin America (October 7, 2005).

In March 2006, Toonami revamped its lineup to include more adult-oriented series, such as Love Hina, taking advantage of the schedule and the refusal of anime on Adult Swim, as well as to compete against anime channel Animax for new anime series. In June 2006, Toonami premiered anime movies in two monthly variations: Dragon Ball Theatricals (which had 17 different Dragon Ball movies), and Toonami Movies (general animated action movies).

In 2007, Cartoon Network cut Toonami completely. The movies were no longer aired (with the exception of the Dragon Ball movies). After its cancellation in Latin America on March 26, 2007, the block's programming gradually vanished. In January 2010, the block Animaction was created, showing on Wednesday evenings. This block broadcast both action programming and anime programming before it was removed in April 2011.

On August 18, 2020, Cartoon Network announced that the Toonami programming block was revived in partnership with Crunchyroll. It was announced that Dragon Ball Super and Mob Psycho 100 would begin airing in the one hour weeknight block. The new incarnation debuted on August 31. The block was closed down on August 30, 2022.

See also

Cartoon Network
Cartoonito
Boomerang
Discovery Kids
Tooncast

References

External links 
Official website

 
Cartoon Network
Anime television
Anime and Cartoon television
Television channels and stations established in 1993
Spanish-language television stations
Latin American cable television networks